Coopers Corner can refer to:
Coopers Corner, Minnesota
Coopers Corner, New Jersey